Wenceslaus I (also Wenceslas, Venceslas, Wenzel, or Václav, often called Wenceslaus of Bohemia in chronicles) (25 February 1337 – 7 December 1383) was the first Duke of Luxembourg from 1354. He was the son of John the Blind, King of Bohemia, and Beatrice of Bourbon.

Life
Beatrice of Bourbon, gave birth to her only child, Duke Wenceslaus I, on February 25, 1337, in Prague. In 1353 Charles IV King of Bohemia, Count of Luxembourg and elected Holy Roman King, entrusted the county, their father's inheritance, to his half-brother Wenceslaus. In 1352, Wenceslaus married Joanna (1322 – 1406), daughter of John III, Duke of Brabant and Limburg, and Marie d'Évreux. In 1354 Charles raised Luxembourg to the status of a duchy. In 1355, Joanna inherited Brabant and Limburg. In order to guarantee the indivisibility of Brabant, Wenceslaus signed the Joyous Entry, but had to fight against his brother-in-law Louis II of Flanders, who asserted his share of the duchy. He failed to prevent the seizure of Brussels by the Flemings, but a certain Everard 't Serclaes succeeded by an audacious coup in driving them out of the city. Thereafter, Wenceslaus had to face primarily internal disorders. In 1371, he overestimated his military capacities and waged war with William II, Duke of Jülich, resulting in humiliating defeat at the Baesweiler, losing a part of his army, and several noblemen. He was captured and suffered 11 months of captivity.

 
Wenceslaus died in Luxembourg, leaving Joanna as sole ruler of Brabant, and was succeeded by Wenceslaus II (Wenceslaus IV of Bohemia) as duke of Luxembourg. There are speculations that he might have died of leprosy. His last wish was his heart to be displaced from his dead body and sent to his wife (Joanna stayed in Brussels). He is buried in a crypt at the now-ruined Orval Abbey in Belgium.

Wenceslaus I of Luxembourg wrote the lyric poetry interpolated in Jean Froissart's Méliador, which was identified as his by Auguste Longnon in the 1890s (Wenceslas was a patron of this chronicler). His lyric output comprises 79 poems (11 ballades, 16 virelais, 52 rondeaux).

Ancestors

References

Sources

Further reading

|-

1337 births
1383 deaths
Bohemian princes
Deaths from leprosy
Dukes of Luxembourg
House of Luxembourg
Sons of kings
es:Venceslao I de Luxemburgo#top